The Birkbeck Lectures in Ecclesiastical History have been held at Trinity College, Cambridge, since 1886.

Lectures 
The source for the list below is: "Past Birkbeck Lectures", Trinity College, Cambridge. Retrieved 15 February 2021.

References 

British lecture series
Trinity College, Cambridge